Giacinto Lambiasi (16 August 1896 - ?) was an Italian pole vaulter.

National titles
Lambiasi won six national championships at individual senior level.

Italian Athletics Championships
Pole vault: 1920, 1921, 1924, 1925, 1926, 1929 (6)

References

External links
 Liste italiane 1908 - 1945, uomini 

1896 births
Date of death missing
Italian male pole vaulters